Ann Magnuson (born January 4, 1956) is an American actress, performance artist, and nightclub performer. She was described by The New York Times in 1990 as "An endearing theatrical chameleon who has as many characters at her fingertips as Lily Tomlin does".

A founding member of the 1980s band Bongwater, Magnuson starred in the ABC sitcom Anything but Love (1989–92). Her film appearances include The Hunger (1983), Making Mr. Right (1987), Clear and Present Danger (1994), Panic Room (2002), and One More Time (2015).

Early life and career
Magnuson was born in Charleston, West Virginia, to a journalist mother and a lawyer father. She had a brother, Bobby, who died in 1988 of complications from AIDS. She attended Holz Elementary and George Washington High School in Charleston.  After graduating from Denison University in 1978, she moved to New York City and was a DJ and performer at Club 57 and the Mudd Club in Manhattan around 1979 through the early 1980s. She created such characters as Anoushka, a Soviet lounge singer, wearing a wig backwards and singing mock-Russian lyrics to pop music standards, and separately sang in an all-girl percussion group, Pulsallama, whose 1982 single "The Devil Lives In My Husband's Body" was a housewife's lament of a spouse who appears to be possessed. Later, in 1987, Magnuson fronted the satirical faux-heavy metal band Vulcan Death Grip.

In an interview for the 2002 WETA-TV PBS special Lance Loud! A Death in An American Family, Magnuson credited the idea of Lance Loud — a member of an all-American family filmed day-in/day-out for the landmark PBS documentary An American Family, who came out as gay during the course of that documentary miniseries — with inspiring her to leave West Virginia for New York: 

Magnuson made her film debut in the 1982 film Vortex.

In the late '70s and early '80s, Magnuson ran Club 57, located in the basement of the Polish National church. It became a center of a world that included Keith Haring, Kenny Scharf, and many others from New York's budding graffiti and downtown scenes. Club 57 was known for its theme nights such as Reggae Miniature Golf and Model World of Glue Night.

Prominence
A fixture of the Manhattan downtown club scene of the 1980s, Magnuson gained attention with her role as a snarky cigarette girl in director Susan Seidelman's 1985 independent film hit Desperately Seeking Susan, which also helped launch the acting career of singer Madonna. Magnuson went on to star in Seidelman's Making Mr. Right (1987), a poorly received science-fiction romance about an android played by John Malkovich.

Concurrently, Magnuson developed an underground following as lead vocalist of the band Bongwater, formed in 1985 with producer-musician Mark Kramer. Bongwater released four avant garde albums and a debut EP before breaking up in 1992 with a legal battle between Magnuson and Kramer that lasted through at least 1996 and ended with the bankruptcy of Kramer's independent-music label Shimmy-Disc.

Magnuson's 15-minute video performance piece "Made for Television", self-produced in 1981, ran on the WNET-PBS series Alive from Off-Center. Her satiric featurette found her playing close to 50 roles in a "channel-hopping" series of visual bites parodying television programming game shows to TV films to televangelists. As art critic Sarah Valdez described it, "a bewigged Ann Magnuson consecutively inhabits, at a rate faster than any channel surfer could keep up with, an outlandish, uproariously unfortunate range of female stereotypes". It was later released by HBO Home Video, together with the Cinemax cable-TV special Vandemonium (1987), in which Magnuson starred in a mostly solo stage piece with appearances by actor-singer Meat Loaf, performance artist Joey Arias, and actor-monologist Eric Bogosian. Magnuson also co-hosted Alive from Off Center during its 1988 season, taking over from fellow performance artist Laurie Anderson, who had hosted the series the year before.

Her 1995 CD The Luv Show (Geffen Records/MCA), her major-label debut, was commercially unsuccessful, but musically adventurous; one critic described it "an MGM musical as directed by Russ Meyer (which means the mambo 'Sex With The Devil'" and 'Miss Pussy Pants' sit comfortably next to Ethel Merman references in the same work)".

As Salon writer John Paczowski described her in 1997:

Later career
From 1989 to 1992, Magnuson played Catherine Hughes, the comically hip editor-in-chief of a Chicago magazine in the television sitcom Anything But Love, opposite Jamie Lee Curtis and comedian Richard Lewis, and played a liberal political commentator on comedian Wanda Sykes' 2003 Fox Broadcasting sitcom Wanda at Large.

Magnuson's film roles have included a snarly real estate agent in Panic Room, Alan's mother in Small Soldiers, a madam in Tank Girl, Mel Gibson's "money junkie" ex-wife in Tequila Sunrise, Tom Berenger's estranged but horny ex-girlfriend in Love at Large, a secretary in Clear and Present Danger, and a sexy victim of David Bowie's vampire in The Hunger.

Her TV guest appearances include an episode each of the Lifetime cable-network fiction-suspense anthology The Hidden Room; the cult-hit, surrealistic comedy-drama The Adventures of Pete and Pete and Salute Your Shorts on  Nickelodeon; the sitcoms The John Larroquette Show, The Drew Carey Show, Caroline in the City, and Frasier; and the police procedural drama CSI: Miami. In the 1996 telefilm The Munsters' Scary Little Christmas, Magnuson played Lily Munster from the original 1960s TV series The Munsters. She appeared in the 1990 Redd Kross music video for the song "Annie's Gone", written about her. As writer Jason Anderson summarized her work through 1996, "She's been appearing in various states of undress for artistic purposes since her performance art daze in late-'70s New York [where s]he was indie rock's thinking vixen...."

Magnuson appeared in the 1990 music video for Redd Kross's "Annie's Gone", and in the 1998 music video for Jerry Cantrell's "My Song". In 1997 she provided guest vocals for the band Tindersticks on the song "Buried Bones" from their album "Curtains".

In 2003, Magnuson began touring a one-woman stage show, Pretty Songs & Ugly Stories, which she mounted through at least July 2006. She played Sister Elizabeth Donderstock in the play The Book of Liz, written by Amy Sedaris and David Sedaris, in May 2005 at the 2nd Stage Theatre in Hollywood, California.
Other theater work has included playwright John Patrick Shanley's Four Dogs and a Bone at the Lucille Lortel Theater in New York City, the one-woman shows You Could Be Home Now (which opened the 1990 Serious Fun festival at New York City's Lincoln Center), and Rave Mom (opened in New York City October 2001), and in a neo-burlesque show The Velvet Hammer.

A Village Voice review described the autobiographical Rave Mom as Magnuson's "travels through 1999 — a year of Ecstasy-popping, bad romance-chasing and searching for escapism and meaning after her brother's death from AIDS. Magnuson has a thoroughly charming presence [but]  her stories of celebrity-studded Oscar parties, kid-filled raves, a wealthy dotcom suitor, and so on, come off as utterly self-absorbed and trivial...."

She has performed at the Revlon/UCLA Breast Center benefit-show series What A Pair! in 2005, performing with Elaine Hendrix "Tips" from the musical Pump Boys & Dinettes, and 2006, performing with Samantha Shelton. She appeared in What's My Line? Live on Stage in Los Angeles on Sept 14, 2006.

For eight years, Magnuson wrote a monthly column, "LA Woman", in the magazine Paper, as well as an accompanying blog.

In late 2006, Magnuson released her second solo album, Pretty Songs & Ugly Stories. It was produced and co-written by long-time musical director and accompanist Kristian Hoffman, with whom Magnuson had had a creative relationship since meeting him when directing "The New Wave Vaudeville Show" in 1976.

In 2007 and 2008, Magnuson performed in a cabaret act, Dueling Harps, with Adam Dugas, Mia Theodoratus, and Alexander Rannie.

In 2009, Magnuson created a one-woman performance piece, Back Home Again (Dreaming Of Charleston), that was commissioned by Charleston, West Virginia's FestiVall.

In 2018, Magnuson joined the cast of The Man in the High Castle, for 5 episodes, as Caroline Abendsen, the wife of title character Hawthorne Abendsen/The Man in the High Castle played by Stephen Root.

Magnuson appeared in the first season of Star Trek: Picard as Fleet Admiral Kirsten Clancy, the commander-in-chief of Starfleet.

Personal life
Magnuson married architect John Bertram in 2002. She has described the Los Angeles neighborhood of Silver Lake, where she lives in her Richard Neutra-designed house, as "a rainbow-coalition Mayberry ... You don't get a sense of anybody really flaunting how rich they are."

Solo albums 
 The Luv Show (1995)
 Pretty Songs & Ugly Stories (2006)
 Dream Girl (2016)

Filmography

Film

Television

Audio
Morning Becomes Eclectic (KCRW radio interview, Jan 25, 1996)
Magnuson appeared on Ken Reid's TV Guidance Counselor podcast on September 21, 2016.

Further reading
TheGazz.com (date n.a., 2006): "My J.T. LeRoy Story: Part 1" and "Part2", by Ann Magnuson. Reprinted, abridged, in Utne Reader (Feb 2007), pp. 96–98.
Interview (Sept 1995): Beverly D'Angelo interviews Ann Magnuson
Artforum (Oct, 1999): "The East Village 1979–1989 - A Chronology: Ann Magnuson on Club 57", by Ann Magnuson
The Village Voice (Aug 20, 1984): "Ann Magnuson: The High Priestess of Low Life", by Don Hewey
eFilmCritic.com (July 9, 2002): "Ann Magnuson - Supernaut", by Thom Fowler

References

External links
The West Virginia & Regional History Center at West Virginia University houses the Ann Magnuson papers within the Distinguished West Virginians Archive

Ann Magnuson official site

OffOffOff.com (Oct 20, 2001): "Burning Woman" (review of autobiographical show), by Robin Eisgrau 
Entertainment Weekly #299 (Nov 3, 1995): "10 Stupid Questions: Magnuson Force"

1956 births
Actresses from West Virginia
American film actresses
American stage actresses
American television actresses
Denison University alumni
George Washington High School (Charleston, West Virginia) alumni
Living people
Performance art in New York City
Actors from Charleston, West Virginia
Actresses from Los Angeles
Singers from West Virginia
Bongwater (band) members
21st-century American actresses
20th-century American actresses
20th-century American singers
20th-century American women singers